Bang Sai is a district (amphoe) in the western part of Phra Nakhon Si Ayutthaya province, central Thailand. There is another district of Ayutthaya which shares the same romanization Bang Sai, but has a different spelling in Thai.

History
The district was created as a minor district (king amphoe) in 1948 with territory taken from Sena district. It was upgraded to a full district in 1958.

Geography
Neighboring districts are (from the north clockwise) Phak Hai, Sena and Lat Bua Luang of Ayutthaya Province, and Bang Pla Ma of Suphanburi province.

Administration
The district is divided into six sub-districts (tambons), which are further subdivided into 53 villages (mubans). The sub-district municipality (thesaban tambon) Bang Sai covers parts of the tambons Bang Sai, Kaeo Fa, and Tao Lao. The non-municipal area is administered by four tambon administrative organizations (TAO).

References

External links
amphoe.com (Thai)

Bang Sai